Gustavo Denegri (born March 1937) is an Italian billionaire businessman, the chairman of DiaSorin, an Italian biotechnology company.

He has a bachelor's degree in chemistry from the University of Turin.

Denegri owns 44% of DiaSorin via IP Investimenti e Partecipazioni, a holding company controlled by his family. By 2020, Forbes estimated his net worth at $3.1 billion.

He is married with two children, and lives in Turin, Italy.

References

1937 births
Italian billionaires
Businesspeople from Turin
Living people
University of Turin alumni